Bergesen may refer to:

 Bergesen (surname)
 Bergesen Island, Nunavut, Canada
 Bergesen d.y., a Norwegian shipping company